The stairways of Naples are over 200 and are complex urban systems that connect various areas of the city comprising  often narrow interconnected stone paths, walks, alleys, steps and ramps — varying in slopes and width, at points bifurcating or overarched by buildings. The history of these features is mainly due to expansions outside the walls of the sixteenth century.

History
The stairways of Naples are ancient pedestrian paths that connect the hills with the center and the coast. The oldest graded paths of the city, most of the time, were born thanks to the coverage of streams or springs, which once flowed just outside the city.

These paths were also made to easily connect the various monumental, especially religious, emergencies: monasteries, retreats, churches, etc. or above all, for urban planning needs.

They are still the subject of study and are considered real urban masterpieces.

Main stairs
Pedamentina stairs
The Petraio
Capodimonte stairs
Santa Maria Apparente stairs
Moiariello stairs
Giuseppe Piazzi stairs
Cacciottoli stairs
San Francesco stairs
Montesanto stairs
Bernando Celentano stairs
Cosma e Damiano stairs
Paradiso stairs
Santa Barbara stairs
Cupa vecchia stairs

References

Naples stairways
Stairways